Bengtskär is an island  southwest of Hanko, and part of the municipality of Dragsfjärd. This rocky island can be reached by ferry from the village of Kasnäs. The island has an area of about two hectares, and only a small part of it is covered with vegetation, the rest is a naked granite.

The lighthouse is owned by the Foundation of the University of Turku. Annually the island attracts over 13,000 tourists.

On 26 July 1941, during the Continuation War Soviet troops attempted to capture and blow up the lighthouse, but the Finnish garrison managed to repel the attack. The lighthouse was damaged but not destroyed.

See also 
 Battle of Bengtskär

References

External links 
 Bengtskär Lighthouse website

Finnish islands in the Baltic
Kimitoön
Landforms of Southwest Finland
Skerries